Quick Money is a 1937 film. It lost $37,000.

Plot summary

Cast
 Fred Stone as Mayor Jonas Tompkins
 Gordon Jones as Bill Adams
 Dorothy Moore as Alice Tompkins
 Berton Churchill as Bluford H. Smythe
 Paul Guilfoyle as Ambrose Ames
 Harlan Briggs as Thorndyke Barnsdale
 Dorothy Vaughan as Lyda Tompkins
 Sherwood Bailey as Freddie Tompkins
 Frank M. Thomas as Jim Clark
 Jack Carson as Coach Woodford
 Kathryn Sheldon as Mrs. Otis
 Dick Elliott as Jeffrey Walker
 Jim Farley as Sheriff Mart (as James Farley)
 Billy Franey as Hotel Clerk Walter (as William Franey)
 Fuzzy Knight as Peter Piper Potter

References

External links
 
 
 
 

1937 comedy films
1937 films
Films directed by Edward Killy
American black-and-white films
American comedy films
1930s American films